Eukaryotic translation initiation factor 3 subunit H (eIF3h) is a protein that in humans is encoded by the EIF3H gene.

Interactions 

eIF3h has been shown to interact with eIF3a.

See also 
Eukaryotic initiation factor 3 (eIF3)

References

Further reading

External links